Denny Vitty (born 1949) is a politician in Northern Ireland.

Vitty was elected to Castlereagh Borough Council for the Democratic Unionist Party (DUP) in 1981, despite only taking 35 first preference votes, as he received transfers from Peter Robinson.

He was then elected to the Northern Ireland Assembly, 1982, as a member of the Democratic Unionist Party for Belfast East - having won only 235 first preference votes.

In 1989, Vitty stood down from Castlereagh Borough Council and was instead elected to North Down Borough Council, In 1991, he served as the Mayor of North Down. He then stood unsuccessfully for the Westminster seat of North Down at the 1992 UK general election, taking only 9.8% of the vote.  In 1993, he did not restand for the council.

Vitty left the DUP and joined the UK Unionist Party (UKUP) in the 1990s.  He stood for the UKUP at the 1998 Northern Ireland Assembly election. He was the last candidate to be eliminated in Belfast East.

Subsequently, he rejoined the DUP and was co-opted to fill a vacancy on Castlereagh Borough Council in December 2010. He was re-elected at the 2011 local elections. At the 2014 local elections, he stood in the Ormiston District Electoral Area of Belfast City Council, but was unsuccessful.

References

1949 births
Living people
Members of Castlereagh Borough Council
Members of North Down Borough Council
Mayors of places in Northern Ireland
Democratic Unionist Party councillors
Northern Ireland MPAs 1982–1986
UK Unionist Party politicians
Democratic Unionist Party parliamentary candidates